Up Close and Dangerous is a half-hour series, produced by NHNZ Ltd. and aired on Animal Planet, profiling each episode three wildlife photographers and their dangerous encounters in filming wild animals.

An example episode ("Elephant Seals, Polar Bears and Pilot Whales") described the following encounters:

Florian Graner filming sea lions, was surprised by an elephant seal;

Max Quinn filming a polar bear and her cub in the Arctic;

Lee Tepley attacked while filming a group of pilot whales.

External links
Up Close and Dangerous page on Animal Planet site 

Animal Planet original programming